Emmons County is a county in the U.S. state of North Dakota. As of the 2010 census, the population was 3,301. Its county seat has been Linton since 1899.

History
The county was created by the Dakota Territory legislature on February 10, 1879, with territories partitioned from Burleigh and Campbell counties. It was not organized at the time, but it was not attached to another county for administrative and judicial purposes. This continued until November 9, 1883, when the governing structure was organized. The county was named for James A. Emmons (1845–1919), a steamboat operator and early Bismarck merchant and entrepreneur.

The first non-Native settlers of Emmons County came from Europe and the eastern United States. The earliest were mostly soldiers discharged from Fort Yates, but civilians began arriving in the 1880s. Two large ethnic groups soon developed: Germans from both Russia and Germany (the latter called Reich Germans) and Hollanders who had come from the eastern United States. The Hollanders lived only in the southwestern part of the county while the Germans settled throughout the area.

The settlers faced hardships in Emmons County, particularly the adverse climate with its extreme seasonal variations in temperature, wind, rain, and snow. Winter blizzards, summer thunderstorms, and tornadoes were a constant threat. Early settlers built crude dwellings using available materials. The first building in Emmons county was a log cabin built near present-day Winona (1852). Other dwellings used tar paper or local rocks. Rocks were a common sight on the prairie, but stone houses were a rarity because they took great care to build. The most common type of dwelling was the sod house, which later became synonymous with pioneering life on the prairie. Sod is prairie grass and dirt cut into blocks and stacked to form walls. Sod was an effective solution to the problem of limited lumber availability. These crude dwellings were eventually abandoned in favor of more modern homes as soon as the necessary building materials became available.

Another hardship was transportation. There were no roads and the nearest railroad station was in Eureka, South Dakota ( away). A horse and wagon were typically used for transportation. Piles of buffalo bones were used as landmarks to aid navigating the vast prairie. Since no bridges existed, creeks and streams presented a major difficulty. Settlers usually traveled in pairs and used both of their teams of horses to pull each wagon across a creek or stream. The first bridge in Emmons County was built in 1889.

The Missouri River forms the county's western boundary. Some settlers earned a living by providing cordwood to the river's steamboats in the summer (river ice halted the boats in wintertime). Ferries moved people and goods across the river, and barges were used to move goods along the river.

The county's first town that still exists was Braddock, established in 1898. A railroad line was laid to Braddock in 1898. Linton was platted in 1899 near the county center, to create a county seat. Linton had 118 residents by 1901, and 245 by 1903. Tirsbol was established in 1902 ten miles (16 km) south of Linton. It became the center of the German immigrant community and was renamed Strasburg. Also in 1902, the town of Hague was established southeast of Strasburg, and Hazelton was platted near Williamsport.

Winona was the first settlement to be created in the county, in 1874, and named 'Devils Colony'. It served soldiers from Fort Yates and the few area settlers. During the 1880s it was the largest town between Bismarck, North Dakota and Pierre, South Dakota. The county's first school was built there in 1884 and the county's first newspaper was published there in 1885. By 1894, the population of the town peaked at over 200. However, the creation of Linton drained the lifeblood from Winona, and it was gone by the early 1900s. The town of Williamsport was established in 1883 by a group of people from Ashland, Ohio and was the first county seat of government. The creation of Linton and Hazelton drained the population from Williamsport and it was abandoned in 1903.

Other towns no longer in existence include Emmonsburg which was located west of Linton, in Beaver Bay, on the Missouri River. It was established in 1888 and abandoned in 1912. Glencoe was also established in 1883 in the northwest corner of the county, but it was abandoned in 1930. Winchester was established in 1884 along Beaver Creek (west of Linton), but was completely abandoned by 1909. Westfield was established in 1888 in the center of the Dutch colony. It was named for Westfield, Iowa but was never incorporated. Godkin was established in 1902, six miles (10 km) north of Linton. Its name was later changed to Temvik, combining the last names of early settlers - the Tempel brothers and Ed Larvik. By 1925 its population peaked to over 200, but the effects of the 1930s Great Depression and being bypassed by the construction of U.S. Highway 83 led to its downfall. Its post office was abandoned in 1968. The final town of note is Kintyre. Settled by Swedes and Norwegians in the 1880s; it was established in 1908 and subsequently abandoned.

Geography
Emmons County lies on the south line of North Dakota. Its south boundary line abuts the north boundary line of the state of South Dakota. The Missouri River flows south-southeasterly along the county's western boundary. The county terrain consists of low rolling hills, mostly devoted to agriculture. Its terrain slopes to the south and east, although its western area slopes westward to the river valley.

Major highways

Adjacent counties

 Burleigh County - north
 Kidder County - northeast
 Logan County - east
 McIntosh County - southeast
 Campbell County, South Dakota - south
 Corson County, South Dakota - southwest
 Sioux County - west
 Morton County - northwest

Protected areas

 Appert Lake National Wildlife Refuge
 Beaver Creek Recreation Area
 Flickertail National Wildlife Management Area
 North Dakota Fisheries Management Area
 Springwater National Wildlife Refuge
 Sunburst Lake National Wildlife Refuge

Lakes

 Appert Lake
 Braddock Dam
 Goose Lake
 Lake Oahe (part)
 Neuwama Lake
 Rice Lake
 Stink Lake
 Sunburst Lake
 Schwahn Lake

Demographics

2000 census
As of the 2000 census, there were 4,331 people, 1,786 households, and 1,241 families in the county. The population density was 3 people per square mile (1/km2). There were 2,168 housing units at an average density of 1.44 per square mile (0.55/km2). The racial makeup of the county was 99.05% White, 0.05% Black or African American, 0.14% Native American, 0.16% Asian, 0.18% Pacific Islander, 0.30% from other races, and 0.12% from two or more races. 1.15% of the population were Hispanic or Latino of any race. 69.2% were of German, 7.5% Dutch, 6.9% American and 5.1% Norwegian ancestry.

There were 1,786 households, out of which 27.20% had children under the age of 18 living with them, 61.00% were married couples living together, 4.40% had a female householder with no husband present, and 30.50% were non-families. 28.40% of all households were made up of individuals, and 16.40% had someone living alone who was 65 years of age or older. The average household size was 2.38 and the average family size was 2.92.

The county population contained 24.80% under the age of 18, 3.70% from 18 to 24, 22.30% from 25 to 44, 23.60% from 45 to 64, and 25.60% who were 65 years of age or older. The median age was 44 years. For every 100 females there were 101.70 males. For every 100 females age 18 and over, there were 100.90 males.

The median income for a household in the county was $26,119, and the median income for a family was $31,857. Males had a median income of $23,235 versus $15,590 for females. The per capita income for the county was $14,604. About 14.70% of families and 20.10% of the population were below the poverty line, including 23.40% of those under age 18 and 24.60% of those age 65 or over.

2010 census
As of the 2010 census, there were 3,550 people, 1,594 households, and 1,003 families in the county. The racial makeup of the county was 98.5% white, 0.4% American Indian, 0.2% Asian, 0.1% black or African American, 0.2% from other races, and 0.8% from two or more races. Those of Hispanic or Latino origin made up 1.0% of the population. In terms of ancestry, 69.1% were German, 16.8% were Russian, 12.3% were Norwegian, 9.6% were Dutch, 5.9% were English, and 1.4% were American.

Of the 1,594 households, 22.6% had children under the age of 18 living with them, 55.4% were married couples living together, 3.8% had a female householder with no husband present, 37.1% were non-families, and 34.4% of all households were made up of individuals. The average household size was 2.19 and the average family size was 2.81. The median age was 50.5 years.

The median income for a household in the county was $35,615 and the median income for a family was $45,464. Males had a median income of $31,468 versus $26,700 for females. The per capita income for the county was $21,358. About 12.4% of families and 16.1% of the population were below the poverty line, including 22.0% of those under age 18 and 20.4% of those age 65 or over.

Communities

Cities

 Braddock
 Hague
 Hazelton
 Linton (county seat)
 Strasburg

Unincorporated communities

 Emmonsburg
 Glencoe
 Kintyre
 Livona
 Temvik
 Williamsport
 Winchester
 Winona

Township
 Campbell

Defunct townships

 Buchanan Valley
 Hazelton
 Lincoln
 McCulley
 Tell

Politics
Emmons County voters have been reliably Republican for decades. In only one national election since 1960 has the county selected the Democratic Party candidate (as of 2020).

See also
 National Register of Historic Places listings in Emmons County, North Dakota

References

External links
 Emmons County maps, Sheet 1 (northern) and Sheet 2 (southern), North Dakota DOT

 
1883 establishments in Dakota Territory
Populated places established in 1883